Lenar may refer to:

Joseph Lenar
Piotr Lenar (born 1958), Polish cinematographer
Lenar Gilmullin (1985–2007), Russian football full-back
Lenar Whitney (born 1959), businesswoman and politician
Lenar, a company best known for the video game Deadly Towers